Pyrilla is a genus of bugs in the subfamily Lophopinae and tribe Lophopini.

Species are distributed in Asia: eastwards from Pakistan to Borneo.  Pyrilla perpusilla, also known as the 'sugarcane planthopper', is a significant pest of sugarcane.

Species 
Fulgoromorpha Lists On the Web lists the following:
 Pyrilla aberrans (Kirby, 1891)
 Pyrilla lycoides (Walker, 1862)
 Pyrilla perpusilla (Walker, 1851)
 Pyrilla protuberans Stål, 1859 – type species
 Pyrilla punjabensis Shakila, 1984
 Pyrilla rahimyarensis Shakila, 1984
 Pyrilla sinica Liang, 1997
 Pyrilla sumatrensis Baker, 1925

References

External links

Auchenorrhyncha genera
Lophopidae
Hemiptera of Asia